Nagyágite is a rare sulfide mineral with known occurrence associated with gold ores. Nagyágite crystals are opaque, monoclinic and dark grey to black coloured.

It was first described in 1845 for an occurrence at the type locality of the Nagyág mine, Săcărâmb, Hunedoara County, Romania.

It occurs in gold–tellurium epithermal hydrothermal veins. Minerals associated with nagyágite include: altaite, petzite, stutzite, sylvanite, tellurantimony, coloradoite, krennerite,
native arsenic, native gold, proustite, rhodochrosite, arsenopyrite, sphalerite, tetrahedrite, calaverite, tellurobismuthite, galena and pyrite.

References 

Sulfosalt minerals
Lead minerals
Gold minerals
Monoclinic minerals
Minerals in space group 11
Minerals described in 1845